The Agusta GA.40 was a 2-cylinder, air-cooled, horizontally opposed engine developed in Italy by Agusta for light aircraft use. It was intended for use in motorgliders. The engine was produced in the 1950s and 1960s.

Specifications

Applications
Corby Starlet
Kokkola Ko-04

Notes

References

1950s aircraft piston engines
Boxer engines
Agusta aircraft engines